Albino de Jesus (born 13 August 1913, date of death unknown) was a Portuguese sports shooter. He competed in the 25 m pistol event at the 1952 Summer Olympics.

References

1913 births
Year of death missing
Portuguese male sport shooters
Olympic shooters of Portugal
Shooters at the 1952 Summer Olympics
Place of birth missing